Jagmohanlal Sinha (12 May 1920 – 20 March 2008) was an Indian judge who served in the Allahabad High Court. He is best known for his 1975 ruling in the State of Uttar Pradesh v. Raj Narain lawsuit in which he invalidated the election of Prime Minister Indira Gandhi.

External links
 Profile at Allahabad High Court
 
 

1920 births
2008 deaths
20th-century Indian judges
People from Aligarh
People from Bareilly
Scholars from Allahabad
The Emergency (India)
Judges of the Allahabad High Court
People from Mathura district